Md. Nazrul Islam Chowdhury (মোঃ নজরুল ইসলাম চৌধুরী) is a Bangladesh Awami League politician and the incumbent Member of Parliament from Chittagong-14.

Early life
Chowdhury was born on 1 February 1952. He has a B.A. degree.

Career
Chowdhury was elected to Parliament from Chittagong-14 on 5 January 2014 as a Bangladesh Awami League candidate. Currently a member of parliamentary standing committee for Ministry of Jute and Textiles and Ministry of Labour and Employment. He was a parliamentary standing committee member for Ministry of Civil Aviation and Tourism in the 10th parliament of Bangladesh.

References

Awami League politicians
Living people
1952 births
10th Jatiya Sangsad members
11th Jatiya Sangsad members